Hienadź Sahanovič (Генадзь Сагановіч; born 13 January 1961) is a Belarusian historian. He specializes in the early modern period of Central European and Belarusian history.

Education and academic career 

In 1984 Sahanovič graduated from the Maxim Tank Belarusian State Pedagogical University in Miensk. Beginning in 1986 he became an active member of the democratic opposition in Soviet Belarus. In 1989 Sahanovič obtained a PhD degree in history from the Institute of History, National Academy of Sciences of Belarus, where he worked as a researcher between 1984 and 2005.  His employment was terminated, in the course of the politically motivated purge of historians and social scientists, whose research did not follow the government's official line. Sahanovič moved to the European Humanities University (EHU), then still based in the Belarusian capital of Miensk. The EHU ceased operating in Belarus in 2004.

In 1994 Sahanovič founded the journal Belaruski Histaryčny Ahliad/Belarusian Historical Review, and since then has served as its Editor-in-Chief. At the same time, he was also a member of the editorial board of another new learned journal (established in 1993), devoted to Belarusian studies, namely, Беларусіка Belarusika/Albaruthenica, as founded and edited by the leading Belarusian philologist and historian Adam Maldzis (Адам Мальдзіс).

Sahanovič works and does research at the EHU, Vilnius, Lithuania, and at the University of Warsaw in the Center for Belarusian Studies, Center for East European Studies. In 2018 Sahanovič obtained a Habilitation degree in history from the University of Warsaw.

Awards

For his research Sahanovič received a Belarusian PEN Club's Francišak Bahuševič award in 1995, and in 2001, an award conferred by the Polish journal Przegląd Wschodni.

Books

 Айчыну сваю баронячы: Канстанцін Астрожскі Ajčynu svaju baroniačy: Kanstancin Astrožski [Kanstancin Astrožski: A Defender of His Fatherland]. 1992. Мiensk: Navuka i technika, 62pp. .
 Войска Вялікага княства Літоўскага ў XVI—XVII стст Vojska Vialikaha kniastva Litoŭskaha ŭ XVI-XVII stst [The Army of the Great Duchy of Lithuania in the 16th-17th Centuries]. 1994. Miensk: Navuka i technika, 79pp. .
 Невядомая вайна, 1654—1667 Nieviadomaja vajna, 1654—1667 [ The Unknown War (book) ]. 1995. Miensk: Navuka i technika. 144pp. .
 With U. Arlov Дзесяць вякоў беларускай гісторыі, 862—1918 Dziesiać viakoŭ bielaruskaj historyi, 862—1918 [Ten Centuries of Belarusian History, 862-1918]. 1999. Vilnius: Naša Budučynia. 223pp. .
 Нарыс гісторыі Беларусі ад старажытнасці да канца XVIII ст.  Narys historyi Bielarusi ad staražytnasci da kanca XVIII st. [An Overview of the History of Belarus from Antiquity to the End of the 18th Century] 2001. Miensk: Encykłapiedyks. 411pp. .
 Bibliografia białoruska, 1992-1994 [Belarusian Bibliography, 1992-1994] (Ser: Bibliografia Europy Wschodniej, Vol 13). 2002. Warsaw: Studium Europy Wschodniej UW, 240pp. 
 Źródła pamięci historycznej współczesnej Białorusi. Powrót zachodniorusizmu [Sources of Historical memory: A Return of ] (Ser: Analizy Instytutu Europy Środkowo-Wschodniej, Vol 14) (translated from the Belarusian into Polish by Andrzej Gil). 2006. Lublin: Instytut Europy Środkowo-Wschodniej, 29pp. 
 Грунвальд у беларускай гісторыі: спроба разбору палітычнага міфа Hrunvald u bielaruskaj historyi: sproba razboru palityčnaha mifa [ The Battle of Grunwald in Belarusian History: An Analysis of the Political Myth] (Ser: Бібліятэка часопіса "Беларускі Гістарычны Агляд" Biblijateka časopisa "Bielaruski Histaryčny Ahliad", Vol 27). 2015. Miensk: Medysont. 414pp.

References

External links

 
 Texts of Scholarly Publications

Research 
 Henadz Sahanovich European Humanities University, Department of History. Retrieved 2018-07-12

Lectures 
 Генадзь Сагановіч. 2012. "Беларусь як акупаванае грамадства" [Belarusian Society Under Muscovian Occupation in the 17th Century]. Retrieved 2018-07-08
 Гісторыкі і гістарычная навука ў нацыябудаўніцтве (Historians and History in the Process of Nation-Building), 2014. Retrieved 2018-07-08
 Генадзь Сагановіч: “Абліччы вольнадумства ў БССР: Мікола Прашковіч і вялікая дыскусія пра гісторыю” [Fascets of Free Thought in Soviet Belarus: Mikoła Praškovič and the Great Discussion on History]. 2021. Беларускі Калегіюм. 21 Apr.

Articles
 Articles by Hienadź Sahanovič in the Беларуская Электронная Бібліятэка
 Генадзь Сагановіч «Грунвальд у беларускай гістарыяграфіі» (The Battle of Grunwald in Belarusian Historiography)
 Генадзь Сагановіч «Русіны пад Грунвальдам (Дуброўнай) у 1410 г» (Ruthenians in the 1410 battle of Grunwald)
 Генадзь Сагановіч «Невядомая вайна, 1654—1667» (The Forgotten Muscovian—Polish-Lithuanian War of 1654-1667)
 Генадзь Сагановіч «Мода на плагіят?» (Why Is Plagiarism So Popular in Today’s Belarus?)

Editor
 Belarusian Historical Review in English
 Belarusian Historical Review, 1996-2005

1961 births
Living people
20th-century Belarusian historians
Belarusian male writers
Maxim Tank Belarusian State Pedagogical University alumni
Male non-fiction writers
21st-century Belarusian historians